The Shire of Bungaree was a local government area northeast of the regional city of Ballarat, Victoria, Australia.

History

Bungaree was first incorporated as a road district on 16 January 1863, and became a shire on 27 January 1871. The shire was originally divided into three ridings in August 1879, but after it lost a small section to the City of Ballaarat on 31 March 1930, it was redivided into two ridings. All divisions were abolished on 6 August 1988, and the council, from then until its dissolution, had nine councillors.

On 6 May 1994, the Shire of Bungaree was abolished, and along with parts of the Shire of Buninyong, was merged into the newly created Shire of Moorabool.

Towns and localities
 Brown Hill
 Bullarook
 Bungaree
 Chapel Flat
 Claretown
 Clarkes Hill
 Glen Park
 Gong Gong
 Invermay
 Leigh Creek*
 Nerrina
 Pootilla
 Wallace

* Council seat.

Population

* Estimate in 1958 Victorian Year Book.

References

External links
 Victorian Places - Bungaree and Bungaree Shire

Bungaree